The monastery of the Exaltation of the Holy Cross is a Basilian monastery in Buchach, Ternopil Oblast, Ukraine. For centuries, it has been the one of the centers of the Ukrainian Greek Catholic Church in Western Ukraine. The monastery is situated near the Fedir hill in Buchach, 18 km southwest of Monastyryska and about 70 km south of Ternopil.

It was founded by Stefan Aleksander Potocki and his wife Joanna née Sieniawska, daughter of Mikołaj Hieronim Sieniawski. In the charter (signed on December 7, 1712 in Lublin) they donated 30,000 zlotys to the Basilians with the purpose of improving education of the Greek Catholic clergy. Their son Mikołaj Bazyli Potocki later made additional donations.

In 1714 the Roman Catholic Archdiocese of Lviv (in the person of Archbishop Jan Skarbek) transferred a small Roman Catholic church in Buchach to the local Basilians. This decision was made permanent by Archbishop Mikołaj Gerard Wyżycki on April 29, 1747.

On September 18, 1771 with the permission of Metropolitan Leo Sheptytsky the abbot of the monastery (Father Innocent Mshanetskyi) consecrated the newly built monastery church of the Elevation of the Precious and Life-Giving Cross.

Major restoration works began in the late 1990s and, as of 2018, were still ongoing.

References

Sources 
 Sadok Barącz. Pamiątki buczackie.— Lwów: Drukarnia «Gazety narodowej», 1882.— 168 s. 
 Basilian Monastery

monastery
Eastern Catholic monasteries in Ukraine
Monasteries of the Order of Saint Basil the Great